Maurus (Mor) Wilhelm (Vilmos) Willinger (9 April 1879 – 29 January 1943) was an Austrian/Hungarian photographer who is best known for his portraits of actors of the early silent film era in Berlin.

Life 
Willinger was born in Budapest, Austria-Hungary, and lived there until 1900. From 1902 to 1918, he ran a photo agency in Berlin while maintaining a studio at Orczy út 8 in Pest. He married Margarethe (who ran the darkroom) and they had a son László Willinger (1909–1989) who also became a portrait photographer. In Berlin he was registered in W 30 at Schwäbische Straße 8.

During the First World War, Willinger was an Honvéd officer in the Austro-Hungarian Army.

After the war, in 1919, he established a studio in Vienna together with Hans Schnapper. In 1921, Schnapper left the studio and Willinger became the sole owner. The Willinger & Schnapper company was located in Kärntnerstraße 28 in the First District of Vienna and remained at that address until 1938 when it was taken over by Adolf Hitler's photographer Heinrich Hoffmann. At one point the studio was one of the largest in Vienna with 30 employees. The photo archive was confiscated by the Gestapo soon after 13 March 1938 and apparently dispatched to the Reichspropagandamt [Reich Propaganda Agency] in Berlin later on.

During his time in Vienna, Willinger founded the  Organisation der Wiener Presse (Organization of the Vienna Press) with various other photographers in 1924. In 1930 he took over part of the company R. Lechner (Wilhelm Müller) and turned it into the agency for Austrian press pictures Willinger & Lechner. Later he founded the together with Leo Ernst and Friedrich Cesanek sales company Austrophot – Willinger, Ernst & Cesanek.

Eventually, the Atelier Willinger operated in Berlin, Vienna and Paris. The Berlin branch operated from 1920 to 1934 under the name of his wife, Margarete Willinger. It was located at Dorotheenstrasse 72 or 60, and (from 1932 to 1934) at Fasanstrasse 68. Their son also worked in several branches of the studio (Paris & Berlin).

Willinger's work shows a wide variety of motifs and events. He photographed "role portraits" of stage actors, scenes from stage plays and portraits. His photographs can be found in various magazines, newspapers, as well as in books. Court documents from a case in Vienna in 1926 show his marital status as "divorced".

Exile and death 
Willinger left Vienna in 1938. He emigrated to Shanghai and was able to ship his photographic equipment with him, where from 1940 he ran his studio, Willinger & Co Shanghai, at 11 Nanking Road.

References

Further reading 
 Das Magazin, Verlag Dr. Eysler & Co., Heft Nr. 66, Berlin/Dresden, Febr. 1930
 Das deutsche Lichtbild. Jahresschau 1931. Dem verdienten Forscher auf den Gebieten der angewanden und wissenschaftlichen Photographie Seiner Exzellenz Feldmarschallleutnant Dr. h.c. Arthur Freiherrn von Hübl in herzlicher Dankbarkeit und aufrichtiger Verehrung gewidmet.
 Das deutsche Lichtbild. Jahresschau 1933. [Vorwort "Wie sieht der Fotograf? Gespräch zwischen Raoul Hausmann und Werner Gräff, Berlin"].
 Ausst.Kat. Geschichte der Fotografie in Österreich, Bad Ischl 1983, Bd.II, S. 193–194
 Reinhard Matz/Wolfgang Vollmer, Köln vor dem Krieg – Leben, Kultur, Stadt 1880–1940, Greven Verlag, Cologne, 2012, 
 Monika Faber/Magdalena Vulkovic (Hg.), Tanz der Hände, Tilly Losch und Hedy Pfundmayr in Fotografien 1920–1935, New Academic Press, Vienna, 2013

1879 births
1943 deaths
Hungarian photographers
Austrian photographers
Austrian photojournalists
Hungarian photojournalists